Leonid Chuchunov (born 27 December 1974) is a Russian wrestler. He competed in the men's freestyle 54 kg at the 2000 Summer Olympics.

References

External links
 

1974 births
Living people
Russian male sport wrestlers
Olympic wrestlers of Russia
Wrestlers at the 2000 Summer Olympics
People from Abakan
Sportspeople from Khakassia
20th-century Russian people
21st-century Russian people